Banwa is one of the 45 provinces of Burkina Faso and is in Boucle du Mouhoun Region. The capital of Banwa is Solenzo. In 2019 it had a population of 345,749.

Education
In 2011 the province had 170 primary schools and 13 secondary schools.

Healthcare
In 2011 the province had 23 health and social promotion centers (Centres de santé et de promotion sociale), 3 doctors and 87 nurses.

Demographics
It is a rural province with 320,963 of its residents living in the countryside; only 24,786 live in urban areas. There are 169,195 men living in Banwa Province and 176,554 women.

Departments
Banwa is divided into 6 departments:

See also
Regions of Burkina Faso
Provinces of Burkina Faso
Communes of Burkina Faso

References 

 
Provinces of Burkina Faso